The First Methodist Church of Clovis is a historic church building at 622 Main Street in Clovis, New Mexico.

It was built in 1929 in a Classical Revival style and was added to the National Register in 1987.

It was originally known as Faith Christian Fellowship, and was constructed by church members at cost of $100,000. Its name was changed in 1930.

See also

National Register of Historic Places in Curry County, New Mexico
The church was not known as Faith Christian Fellowship.  Reference to correct information is found in The Clovis Book in Carver Public Library or First United Methodist Church historical documents housed in its history center.

References

Methodist churches in New Mexico
Churches on the National Register of Historic Places in New Mexico
Neoclassical architecture in New Mexico
Churches completed in 1929
National Register of Historic Places in Curry County, New Mexico
Clovis, New Mexico
Neoclassical church buildings in the United States